Solanum ensifolium is a species of plant in the family Solanaceae endemic to Puerto Rico. Commonly known as erubia, it is nearly extinct due to habitat loss.

Synonyms
 Solanum drymophilum O.E.Schulz
 Solanum longifolium Pav. ex Dunal
Solanum congestiflorum var. longifolium is S. crispum
Solanum longifolium of Sessé & Mociño actually refers to the S. muricatum of Aiton.
Solanum longifolium of Dunal is Solanum subinerme.
Solanum nudum var. longifolium refers to S. sieberi

References

Footnotes
 
 

ensifolium
Endemic flora of Puerto Rico
Critically endangered plants
Taxonomy articles created by Polbot
Taxobox binomials not recognized by IUCN